Remotion is a 1995 ambient music album by Global Communication. Originally released on Dedicated Records, the album has been re-issued a number of times.

The album features a number of remixes that Global Communication had done for other artists.
It also includes one track (not a remix) from their more techno-leaning side project, Reload.

Track listing
Jon Anderson "Amor Real" – 8:59
Chapterhouse "Delta Phase" – 9:52
Warp 69 "Natural High" – 9:04
Reload "Le Soleil et la Mer" – 8:09
The Grid "Rollercoaster" – 8:18
Chapterhouse "Epsilon Phase" – 11:21
Nav Katze "Wild Horses" – 15:12

Notes
The Chapterhouse remixes appeared on Global Communication's earlier release Pentamerous Metamorphosis. (Delta Phase) as it appears on this release, is approximately 49secs shorter than on its original '93 release, and 22 secs shorter than on the '98 remaster/reissue.

The Reload track is not a remix, but the same version as it originally appeared on the Reload album A Collection of Short Stories.

All other remixes can also be found on releases by their original artists.

References

External links

1995 albums
Global Communication albums
Dedicated Records albums